Ismail Mustafavič Alieksandrovič (Ismail Mustafovich Aleksandrovich; born 18 July 1929) is a Belarusian mufti who was leader of the Muslim Religious Community of the Republic of Belarus from its founding in 1994 until 2005.

Early life 
Alieksandrovič was born on 18 July 1929 in Kletsk, in what was then the Second Polish Republic. In his early years, he received an Islamic education from his family in addition to secular education. His family was significant in the Kletsk Muslim community; his father, Mustafa Jasufovič Alieksandrovič, was elected imam in 1939, and held the position until being coerced into resignation by the government of the Soviet Union in 1953. The same year, Ismail graduated from the Belarusian National Technical University as a civil engineer.

From 1954 to 1956, Alieksandrovič worked as a foreman at a construction site in Magnitogorsk, and also served as senior works manager and chief engineer of Chelyabinsk Oblast Construction Board of the Russian Soviet Federative Socialist Republic. From 1961 to 1986, he worked as an engineer in Minsk, before retiring in 1989.

Religious career 
In 1994, during the First All-Belarusian Congress of Muslims, Alieksandrovič was elected to serve as mufti of the Muslim Religious Community of the Republic of Belarus. In 1996 and 1998, he was re-elected to this position. From 1990, he also participated in the Al-Kitab Association of Tatar Muslims, a global organisation of Lipka Tatars.

Alieksandrovič's efforts bore fruit in reviving the Belarusian Muslim community; when he first took office as mufti, there were 11 Muslim communities in Belarus and one mosque. By the time of the Third Congress, there were 24 communities and 4 mosques.

References 

1929 births
Living people
People from Kletsk District
Belarusian civil engineers
Belarusian Muslims
Tatar muftis
Belarusian religious leaders
Belarusian people of Tatar descent